Keith N. Hamilton is an American writer who was formerly chair of the Utah Board of Pardons and Parole. In that capacity he was the first African American to serve in the Cabinet of the State of Utah.

Hamilton was born in Virginia and raised primarily in New Jersey and North Carolina. His grandfather was a Southern Baptist preacher.

Hamilton joined the Church of Jesus Christ of Latter-day Saints in 1980 while a student at North Carolina State University. He served as a missionary in Puerto Rico and Barbados. After his missionary service, he earned a J.D. degree from the J. Reuben Clark Law School of Brigham Young University, being the first African American to graduate from that institution.

After graduating, Hamilton served for several years in the United States Navy in the Judge Advocate General's Corps. He has worked in administrative positions at Brigham Young University and the University of Massachusetts Amherst.

Hamilton served from 1995 to 2003 and 2005 to 2009 on the Utah Board of Pardons and Parole, including as chair from March 2006 until May 2007, a position which made him a member of the Utah Governor's Cabinet.

He has written an autobiography entitled Last Laborer: Thoughts and Reflections of a Black Mormon.  From 2011 to 2014 he was an adjunct professor of law at the J. Reuben Clark Law School and has served as a columnist for the Deseret News.

He very briefly spent part of his time teaching and coaching football at Summit Academy High School in Bluffdale, Utah.

In the LDS Church Hamilton has served in multiple positions including serving as a bishop in the San Francisco California Stake during the time Quentin L. Cook was president of that stake.

References 

Black LDS article on Hamilton
Deseret News April 21, 2011 article on Keith Hamilton
Deseret News Sep. 29, 2009 article on Hamilton's service on the Utah Parole Board
Salt Lake Tribune June 9, 2011

External links 
bio of Hamilton from his website

North Carolina State University alumni
Converts to Mormonism
African-American Latter Day Saints
J. Reuben Clark Law School alumni
People from Virginia
Year of birth missing (living people)
Brigham Young University staff
University of Massachusetts Amherst people
Living people
African-American missionaries
American Mormon missionaries
Mormon missionaries in Puerto Rico
Mormon missionaries in Barbados
20th-century Mormon missionaries
Latter Day Saints from Utah
Latter Day Saints from New Jersey
Latter Day Saints from North Carolina
Latter Day Saints from California
Latter Day Saints from Massachusetts